Binhai County is a coastal county under the administration of Yancheng, Jiangsu province, China. In this county, the Yellow Sea coast turns from a north-northwest/south-southeast bearing to a northwest/southeast bearing. It is well-known for its mouth-watering sausage. The sausage is made from pork seasoned with Sichuan peppercorns, star anise, cinnamon, angelica, ginger etc. and air dried for 3 to 4 days.

Administration divisions

Binhai County consists of 10 towns and 5 townships.
10 towns

5 townships

Climate

References

External links
 Government website of Binhai (in Chinese)
Binhai County English guide (Jiangsu.NET)

County-level divisions of Jiangsu
Yancheng